Basketball 3x3 at the 2018 Central American and Caribbean Games was be held at the Plaza de la Paz in Barranquilla, Colombia from the 26 to 28 July.

Medal summary

Men's tournament

Group stage

Knockout stage

Bracket

Semifinals

Third place game

Final

Final standings

Women's tournament

Group A

Group B

Knockout stage

Bracket

Quarterfinals

Semifinals

Third place game

Final

Final standings

References

External links
2018 Central American and Caribbean Games – Basketball 3x3

2018 Central American and Caribbean Games events
Central American and Caribbean Games
2018
Central American and Caribbean Games